The Barcelona orbital line is a railway project forming part of both the Pla d'infraestructures de Catalunya (PITC), a long-term development plan due for completion in 2026, and the  Pla de transport de viatgers de Catalunya (PTVC), a short-term plan due for completion in 2012. In following perimeter routes the orbital line and another railway project, the Eix Transversal Ferroviari de Catalunya, are the first railway schemes to depart from the radial system developed so far in the Barcelona area.

Also known as the Quart cinturó ferroviari, the orbital line will connect Rodalies Barcelona services between Vilanova i la Geltrú and Mataró via a  line passing through Granollers, Sabadell, Terrassa, Martorell and Vilafranca del Penedès, but avoiding the actual city of Barcelona.

Notes

References

Proposed railway lines in Spain
Railway lines in Catalonia
Rodalies de Catalunya lines
Transport in Alt Penedès
Transport in Baix Llobregat
Transport in Garraf
Transport in Maresme
Transport in Vallès Occidental
Transport in Vallès Oriental